Macsuzy Mondon  is a Seychellois teacher and politician who has served in the Cabinet of Seychelles as Designated Minister and Minister of Local Government from October 2016 until 3 November 2020.

Career
Mondon, a former teacher, was appointed as Minister of Health in 2006 and subsequently served as Minister of Education from 2010 to 2016. In the cabinet of President Danny Faure, appointed in October 2016, she became the first woman to serve as Designated Minister; she was sworn in on 28 October, and she was additionally appointed as Minister for Local Government on 29 October, while leaving her post as Minister of Education. In the April 2018 reshuffle Youth, Sports, Culture and Disastermanagement were added to her ministries.

References

Living people 
United Seychelles Party politicians
21st-century women politicians
Université du Québec à Trois-Rivières alumni
Seychellois educators
Year of birth missing (living people)
Women government ministers of Seychelles
Culture ministers of Seychelles
Education ministers of Seychelles
Health ministers of Seychelles
Interior ministers of Seychelles
Youth ministers of Seychelles
Sports ministers of Seychelles